Ful Haus is a Philippine television situational comedy series broadcast by GMA Network. Directed by Bert de Leon, it stars Vic Sotto and Pia Guanio. It premiered on August 5, 2007 on the network's KiliTV line up. The series concluded on August 16, 2009 with a total of 107 episodes. It was replaced by Show Me Da Manny in its timeslot.

Cast and characters

Lead cast
Vic Sotto as Fulgencio 'Ful' Palisoc
Pia Guanio as Grace Palisoc

Supporting cast
Jose Manalo as Juan Miguel 'Onemig' Palisoc
BJ Forbes as Juan Miguel 'One-Two' Palisoc, Jr.
Joonee Gamboa as Pidyong Palisoc
Marissa Delgado as Andrea Palisoc
Richie Reyes as Coco
Jojo Bolado as Manny
Mitoy Yonting as Buboy
Sugar Mercado as Toni
Patani Daño as herself
Dax Martin
Rita De Guzman

Accolades

References

External links
 

2007 Philippine television series debuts
2009 Philippine television series endings
Filipino-language television shows
GMA Network original programming
Philippine comedy television series
Television series by M-Zet Productions